is a Japanese youth subculture associated with customized motorcycles. The first appearance of these types of biker gangs was in the 1950s. Popularity climbed throughout the 1980s and 1990s, peaking at an estimated 42,510 members in 1982. Their numbers dropped dramatically in the 2000s, with fewer than 7,297 members in 2012.

 style traditionally involves boilersuits similar to those of manual laborers or leather military jackets with baggy pants, and tall boots.

History 
 first started as groups of returning World War II veterans. The disobedient subculture originated in the 1950's when the young kamikaze pilots came back from World War II.  Many veterans faced difficulty readjusting to society after the war, and some turned to custom car making and gang-like activities on city streets to gain an adrenaline fix. These early  took inspiration from American greaser culture and imported Western films;  became known for its many similarities to old American biker culture. Many younger individuals began to see this style of life as very appealing, especially marginalized individuals looking for change. Eventually, these youngsters took over the identity, becoming the foundation for the modern .

The 1970s were when the term of  first truly began to emerge. This was a period of time characterized by actual riots between police and many of these youth groups. The term  was not actually created by these biker groups, but was eventually widely adopted and used by these various groups. In the 1980s and 1990s,  would often embark on massed rides, in which up to 100 bikers would cruise together slowly en masse down an expressway or major highway. The motorcyclists would run toll booths without stopping and would ignore police attempts to detain them. New Year's Eve was a popular occasion for the massed rides. The bikers would sometimes smash the cars and threaten or beat up any motorists or bystanders who got in the way or expressed disapproval of the bikers' behavior. Participation in the gangs peaked at 42,510 members in 1982. This made  the prevailing form of youth delinquency within Japan.

Numbers slowly began to decline following the 1980s peak. It is reported that, by the 1990s there were around 28,000  sprinkled throughout the country. In 2004, the Japanese government passed a revised road traffic law which gave the police more power to arrest bikers riding recklessly in groups. With increased arrests and prosecutions,  participation rapidly went into decline. As of 2010, police reported that the new trend among  was to ride together in much smaller groups and to ride scooters instead of heavily modified motorcycles. Aichi prefecture was reported to have the highest number of riders, followed by Tokyo, Osaka, Ibaraki and Fukuoka. By 2015, there were only a reported 6,771 active  throughout Japan. In 2013, the National Police Agency re-classified  biker gangs as "pseudo-yakuza" organizations.

Traits 
 are usually between the ages of 16 and 20 years old. They are known for their style that heavily mimics greaser culture within the United States. This includes a pompadour style haircut,  uniforms, which were often modified and embroidered jumpsuits, inspired by those worn by manual laborers during the WWII era, baggy pants and military boots.  were often embroidered with various slogans and large, intricate designs. They were seen as a status symbol to many, symbolizing both their pride in themselves and their strength. They were often worn open in the front, with bandage wrappings around their waist. They would also often be accompanied by rounded sunglasses and  sashes.

The word  is also applied to motorcycle subculture with an interest in motorcycle customizing, often illegal, and making noise by removing the mufflers on their vehicles so that more noise is produced. These  groups sometimes ride without motorcycle helmets (which in Japan is illegal), also engage in dangerous or reckless driving, such as weaving in traffic, and running red lights. Another activity is speeding in city streets, not usually for street racing but more for thrills. With many bikes involved, the leading one is driven by the leader, who is responsible for the event and is not allowed to be overtaken.

Vehicles

 are known to modify their motorcycles in peculiar and showy ways, which are called . The general style of  bike modification appears to combine elements of an American chopper bike and a British café racer. Examples of modifications that are taken from these styles are raised handle bars like those on a chopper or over-sized fairings like those found on café racers (though  usually fit them much higher on the bike than their original position, and angled upwards at the front).

Loud paint schemes on the fenders or the gas tanks with motifs such as flames or kamikaze-style "rising sun" designs are also quite common. The bikes will often be adorned with stickers and/or flags depicting the gang's symbol or logo.

There are also marked regional differences in motorcycle modifications. For example, Ibaraki  are known to modify their motorcycles in an extensively colorful, flashy way. They will often have three or four oversized fairings in a tower-like way in and an abundance of lights.

In America the term "Bosozoku" is also applied to cars that have undergone extreme modification.  The term generally only applies to Japanese manufactured vehicles, and is somewhat interchangeable with the term "Kaido Racer".  Broadly, "Bosozoku" refers to the concept of Japanese vehicle modification, whereas "Kaido Racer" refers specifically to car modification.

Ties to organized crime 
In general, the Japanese government sees  as highly organized groups, affiliated under several national federations. They are known to be surprisingly well organized, despite generally only having a handful of members above the age of twenty. They also generally have clear cut rules, uniforms, symbols, and other marks of organization. Certain groups even have membership fees and set punishments. These groups also make up a large proportion of Japanese criminal activity, being involved in vandalism, road traffic violations, and other criminal activity.

Their lives of crime generally do not end after they turn twenty though. Alongside that, they have been shown to have ties to various yakuza organizations. In fact, some numbers predict that as many as one-third of yakuza recruits come from one of a few . However, as these groups become less common, their ties to the yakuza become less apparent, as they begin recruiting from other marginalized groups, such as the Japanese  or Zainichi ethnic Koreans.

See also 

 Mat Rempit
 Ah Beng
 Mod, a youth movement in the United Kingdom, associated with customised scooters
 Outlaw motorcycle club
 Raggare
 Tafheet

References

Citations

Bibliography

 Fujisawa Toru. . Shonen Magazine Comics. 
 Greenfeld, Karl Taro. Speed Tribes: Days and Nights with Japan's Next Generation. New York: HarperCollins, 1994. .
 Sato, Ikuya. Kamikaze Biker: Parody and Anomy in Affluent Japan. Chicago: University of Chicago Press, 1998. .
 Sasaki, Hiroto, and Tokoro Jewzo. . Shonen Magazine Comics. .
 Yoshinaga, Masayuki. Bosozoku. London: Trolley Books, 2002. .

External links 

 Metropolis magazine, Last of the Speed Tribes (general article about bōsōzoku culture and its decline)
 Vice, Life Inside Japan's Aging Biker Gangs (documentary about current and former bōsōzoku)
 Mookychick, Bosozoku japanese biker gangs and bosozoku style (key elements of bōsōzoku fashion)
 Bosozoku Style (blog showcasing bōsōzoku style cars)

Gangs in Japan
Japanese subcultures
Motorcycling subculture
Street gangs
Japanese words and phrases
Motorcycle customization